Northeast College Preparatory School is a public high school located in Rochester, Monroe County, New York, U.S.A., and is one of eighteen high schools operated by the Rochester City School District. It shares the Douglass Campus with the Northwest College Preparatory School.

The Douglass Campus was formerly the Frederick Douglass Preparatory School before it was forced to be closed by the state due to poor performance. In September 2007, the Northeast and Northwest schools opened at the campus.

Footnotes

High schools in Monroe County, New York
Public high schools in New York (state)